Lee Hong-yuan (born 21 June 1956) is a Taiwanese politician. He was the Minister of the Ministry of the Interior (MOI) of the Executive Yuan from 2012 to 2014.

Early life
Lee Hong-yuan was born in Taishan, Taipei County to a farmer family. His father Lee Teng-hui served as head of the district. Lee's younger brother is Lee Hung-chun. He obtained his bachelor's degree in hydraulic engineering from National Cheng Kung University. He then earned an M.S. (1982) and Ph.D. (1984) in Civil and Environmental Engineering from the University of Iowa, where was inducted as a member of the Distinguished Engineering Alumni Academy in 2008.

Upon graduation, Lee worked in the United States for two years before returning to Taiwan in 1986 to teach at National Taiwan University. Lee has also been a visiting professor at five universities in China and in the Netherlands.

ROC Interior Ministry

Personal life
Lee is married to Hui Hsin Lee and has four children.

References

1956 births
Living people
Taiwanese Ministers of the Interior
People First Party (Taiwan) politicians
Politicians of the Republic of China on Taiwan from New Taipei
Academic staff of the National Taiwan University
Taiwanese educators